Lotfabad (also Romanized as Loṭfābād) is a village in Seyyedvaliyeddin Rural District, Sardasht District, Dezful County, Khuzestan Province, Iran. In 2006, its population was 166, in 28 families.

References 

Populated places in Dezful County